The 2017 DFL-Supercup was the eighth edition of the German super cup under the name DFL-Supercup, an annual football match contested by the winners of the previous season's Bundesliga and DFB-Pokal competitions. The match was played on 5 August 2017.

The DFL-Supercup featured Borussia Dortmund, the winners of the 2016–17 DFB-Pokal, and Bayern Munich, the winners of the 2016–17 Bundesliga and holders of the competition.

Bayern Munich won the DFL-Supercup 5–4 on penalties following a 2–2 draw after 90 minutes for their sixth title.

Teams
In the following table, matches until 1996 were in the DFB-Supercup era, since 2010 were in the DFL-Supercup era.

Background
Bayern Munich were the reigning champions, having beaten Borussia Dortmund 2–0 in the 2016 edition.

Both teams have won the competition five times, a joint record. The match was Dortmund's second consecutive and ninth overall appearance, with a record of five wins and three losses prior. The match was Bayern's record sixth consecutive and record eleventh overall appearance, with a record of five wins and five losses prior. This was the record sixth super cup between Dortmund and Bayern, having previously met in 1989, 2012, 2013, 2014, and 2016. Of these, Dortmund have won three (in 1989, 2013, and 2014), while Bayern have won twice (in 2012 and 2016).

This was the first competitive match for Peter Bosz as head coach of Borussia Dortmund, moving from Ajax in the summer to replace Thomas Tuchel.

Match

Summary
Christian Pulisic opened the scoring for Borussia Dortmund in the 12th minute when he ran in on goal and shot low with his right foot past the advancing Sven Ulreich. Robert Lewandowski made it 1–1 in the 18th minute when he finished with his right foot from close range after a low cross from the right by Joshua Kimmich. Pierre-Emerick Aubameyang made it 2–1 in the 71st minute when he clipped the ball over the advancing Sven Ulreich from the right of the penalty area with his right foot.

With two minutes to go the ball deflected into the net off Roman Bürki from close range after an initial shot from Joshua Kimmich hit Marc Bartra and came back to hit Bürki before going into the net. In the penalty shoot-out, Joshua Kimmich missed for Bayern Munich and Sebastian Rode missed for Borussia Dortmund. Marc Bartra the took the sixth penalty for Borussia Dortmund where his shot was saved to his right by Sven Ulreich which allowed Bayern Munich to win 5–4 on penalties for their sixth Supercup.

Details

Statistics

See also
2016–17 Bundesliga
2016–17 DFB-Pokal

References

External links

2017
2017–18 in German football cups
Borussia Dortmund matches
FC Bayern Munich matches
Dfl-Supercup
DFL-Supercup 2017